

Alwin Wolz (22 September 1897 – 15 September 1978) was a general in the Luftwaffe of Nazi Germany during World War II who commanded the 3. Flak Division. He was a recipient of the Knight's Cross of the Iron Cross.  Wolz was appointed combat commander of Hamburg on 15 April 1945. He surrendered the city to the British 7th Armoured Division on 3 May 1945.

Awards and decorations

 German Cross in Gold (21 August 1942)
 Knight's Cross of the Iron Cross on 4 June 1943 as Oberst and commander of Flak-Regiment 135 (mot.)

References

Citations

Bibliography

 

1897 births
1978 deaths
People from Weißenburg-Gunzenhausen
People from the Kingdom of Bavaria
Major generals of the Luftwaffe
German Army personnel of World War I
Luftwaffe World War II generals
Imperial German Navy personnel of World War I
Military personnel from Bavaria
German police officers
German prisoners of war in World War II held by the United Kingdom
Recipients of the clasp to the Iron Cross, 1st class
Recipients of the Gold German Cross
Recipients of the Knight's Cross of the Iron Cross
Recipients of the Silver Medal of Military Valor
Recipients of the Military Merit Order (Bavaria)